Longest Night, The Longest Night or The Longest Nite may refer to:

 Winter solstice, the day in December (Northern Hemisphere) and June (Southern Hemisphere) with the longest night of the year
 Longest Night Service or Blue Christmas, a Western Christian tradition marking the December winter solstice

Film and television
 The Longest Night (1936 film), an American film directed by Errol Taggart
 The Longest Night (1965 film), a Hong Kong film featuring Betty Loh Ti
 The Longest Night (1972 film), an American television film
 The Longest Night (1983 film), a Taiwanese film featuring Chin Han
 The Longest Night (1991 film), a Spanish film directed by José Luis García Sánchez
 The Longest Nite, a 1998 Hong Kong film by Patrick Yau and Johnnie To
 The Longest Night (2019 film), an Ecuadorian film directed by Gabriela Calvache
 "The Longest Night" (Only Fools and Horses), a television episode
 UNIT: The Longest Night, a Doctor Who audio drama

Literature
 The Longest Night (Angel novel), a novel based on the television series Angel
 X-Factor volume 1: The Longest Night, a comic by Peter David

Music
 "The Longest Night" (song), by the Bee Gees, 1987
 "Longest Night", a song by Brian Cadd from White on White, 1976
 "The Longest Night", a song by Michelle Wright from Michelle Wright, 1990

Video games 

 Longest Night (video game), a 2013 companion game of the video game Night in the Woods

See also
 Night (disambiguation)